The Department of Biosystems and Agricultural Engineering (or BAE) at the University of Minnesota (part of the Department of Bioproducts and Biosystems Engineering (or BBE) as of July 1, 2006) was founded in 1909. As of 2017, the current department head is Gary Sands. Its mission is 

"...to integrate engineering, science, technology and management for sustainable use of renewable resources and enhancement of the environment."

The department is conjoined in operation with the Institute of Technology and the College of Food, Agricultural, and Natural Resource Sciences (CFANS). It has both graduate and undergraduate academic programs.

Undergraduate program
The undergraduate degrees now offered and their individual emphases are: 

Bachelor of Bioproducts and Biosystems Engineering
Bioproducts Engineering (BPE)
Environmental and Ecological Engineering (EEE)
Bioprocessing and Food Engineering (BFE)

Bachelor of Science in Bio-Based Products
Bio-based Products Marketing and Management (BPMM)
Residential Building Science and Technology (RBST)

Bachelor of Science in Environmental Science and Policy Management
Corporate Environmental Management (CEM)

Graduate program
See external links below.

References

External links
Undergraduate Program
Graduate Program
Faculty

University of Minnesota
Educational institutions established in 1909
1909 establishments in Minnesota